is a Japanese former professional baseball pitcher in Japan's Nippon Professional Baseball. He played for the Hanshin Tigers from 2008 to 2016.

External links

NPB stats

1987 births
Living people
People from Neyagawa, Osaka
Baseball people from Osaka Prefecture
Japanese baseball players
Nippon Professional Baseball pitchers
Hanshin Tigers players